The Aguapeí River is a river of São Paulo state in southeastern Brazil. It is a left tributary of the Paraná River.

The park contains large areas of floodplain, and is flooded in the rainy season when the Aguapeí overflows its banks.
The mouth of the river is protected by the  Mouth of the Aguapeí Private Natural Heritage Reserve, created in 2010.

See also
List of rivers of São Paulo

References

Sources

Rivers of São Paulo (state)
Tributaries of the Paraná River